Milan Bališ is a Slovak professional ice hockey player who played with HC Slovan Bratislava in the Slovak Extraliga.

References

External links

Living people
HC Slovan Bratislava players
Year of birth missing (living people)
Slovak ice hockey defencemen
Ice hockey people from Bratislava